Patrick De Wilde (born 19 April 1964) is a Belgian football manager who works as technical director of Lithuania.

Career

In 2007, De Wilde was appointed assistant manager of Ukrainian side Metalurh (Donetsk) after managing Eendracht Aalst in the Belgian lower leagues.

In 2008, he was appointed technical director of a Belgian field hockey club after working as youth coach of the Aspire Academy in Qatar.

In 2010, De Wilde was appointed manager of Chinese third division outfit Tianjin Tianhai after working as assistant manager o Beveren in the Belgian top flight, where he  underwent brain tumor removal surgery and helped them achieve promotion to the Chinese second division.

In 2011, he was appointed youth coach of Red Bull Salzburg, one of Austria's most successful clubs.

In 2012, De Wilde was appointed manager of Liefering in the Austrian lower leagues, before working as a scout of Red Bull Salzburg.

In 2016, he was appointed manager Saudi Arabian side Khaleej after managing KV Kortrijk in the Belgium.

In 2017, he was appointed manager of Chinese third division club Hunan Billows after working as assistant manager of Algeria.

In 2018, De Wilde was appointed manager of ESS in Tunisia after working as assistant manager of Hungary.

In 2019, he was appointed technical director of Lithuania after working as assistant manager of Iranian team Tractor.

References

External links

 Patrick De Wilde at Békeffy Football Consulting

1964 births
Living people
Belgian football managers
S.C. Eendracht Aalst managers
Tianjin Tianhai F.C. managers
FC Liefering managers
K.V. Kortrijk managers
Khaleej FC managers
Étoile Sportive du Sahel managers
Belgian expatriate football managers
Belgian expatriate sportspeople in Ukraine
Belgian expatriate sportspeople in Qatar
Expatriate football managers in China
Belgian expatriate sportspeople in China
Expatriate football managers in Austria
Belgian expatriate sportspeople in Austria
Expatriate football managers in Saudi Arabia
Belgian expatriate sportspeople in Saudi Arabia
Belgian expatriate sportspeople in Algeria
Belgian expatriate sportspeople in Hungary
Expatriate football managers in Tunisia
Belgian expatriate sportspeople in Tunisia
Belgian expatriate sportspeople in Iran
Belgian Pro League managers
Saudi Professional League managers
Tunisian Ligue Professionnelle 1 managers